Cenostigma is a genus of flowering plants in the family Fabaceae. It belongs to the subfamily Caesalpinioideae. Cenostigma pluviosa is being investigated as a possible antimalarial medication.

Species
Cenostigma comprises the following species:
 Cenostigma bracteosum (Tul. 1844) E. Gagnon & G. P. Lewis 2016
 Cenostigma eriostachys (Benth. 1844) E. Gagnon & G. P. Lewis 2016
 Cenostigma gaumeri (Greenm. 1912) E. Gagnon & G. P. Lewis 2016
 Cenostigma laxiflorum (Tul. 1844) E. Gagnon & G. P. Lewis 2016
 Cenostigma macrophyllum Tul. 1843
 Cenostigma marginatum (Tul. 1844) E. Gagnon & G. P. Lewis 2016
 Cenostigma microphyllum (Mart. ex G. Don 1832) E. Gagnon & G. P. Lewis 2016
 Cenostigma myabense (Britton 1920) E. Gagnon & G. P. Lewis 2016
 Cenostigma nordestinum E. Gagnon & G. P. Lewis 2016
 Cenostigma pellucidum (Vogel 1836) E. Gagnon & G. P. Lewis 2016
 Cenostigma pinnatum (Griseb. 1866) E. Gagnon & G. P. Lewis 2016
 Cenostigma pluviosum (DC. 1825) E. Gagnon & G. P. Lewis 2016—False brazilwood
 var. cabralianum (G. P. Lewis 1998) E. Gagnon & G. P. Lewis 2016
 var. intermedium (G. P. Lewis) E. Gagnon & G. P. Lewis
 var. maraniona (G. P. Lewis & C. E. Hughes 2010) E. Gagnon & G. P. Lewis 2016
 var. paraense (Ducke 1925) E. Gagnon & G. P. Lewis 2016
 var. peltophoroides (Benth. 1870) E. Gagnon & G. P. Lewis 2016
 var. pluviosum (DC. 1825) E. Gagnon & G. P. Lewis 2016
 var. sanfranciscanum (G. P. Lewis 1998) E. Gagnon & G. P. Lewis 2016
 Cenostigma pyramidale (Tul. 1844) E. Gagnon & G. P. Lewis 2016
 var. diversifolium (Benth. 1870) E. Gagnon & G. P. Lewis 2016
 var. pyramidale (Tul. 1844) E. Gagnon & G. P. Lewis 2016
 Cenostigma tocantinum Ducke 1915

References

External links 

Caesalpinieae
Fabaceae genera
Taxa named by Edmond Tulasne